Deh Nevoiyeh (also Romanized as Deh Nevo’īyeh, Dahnū’īyeh, Dehnoo’eyeh, and Deh Now’īyeh; also known as Dehnow and Dahna) is a village in Ekhtiarabad Rural District, in the Central District of Kerman County, Kerman Province, Iran. At the 2006 census, its population was 118, in 35 families.

References 

Populated places in Kerman County